Amt Altdöbern is an Amt ("collective municipality") in the district of Oberspreewald-Lausitz, in Brandenburg, Germany. Its seat is in Altdöbern.

The Amt Altdöbern consists of the following municipalities:
Altdöbern
Bronkow
Luckaitztal
Neupetershain
Neu-Seeland

Demography

References

Altdobern
Oberspreewald-Lausitz